Panther Creek High School may refer to the following schools in the United States:

Panther Creek High School (North Carolina), in Cary, North Carolina
Panther Creek High School (Texas), in Valera, Texas